The Hardie Boys (alternatively spelled "Hardy Boys") can refer to:
Michael Hardie Boys, former New Zealand Governor-General.
The Hardy Boys, series of detective/adventure books.